Stephen Barnes Lacy (October 24, 1908 – February 3, 2000) was an American college sports coach, educator, and political adviser. He served as the head football coach at Milligan College—now known as Milligan University—in Milligan College, Tennessee from 1933 to 1942.

A native of Sullivan County, Tennessee, Lacy entered Milligan College in 1927. Even though he had never seen football played before coming to Milligan, he made the varsity Milligan Buffaloes football team in 1928 and was team captain as a senior in 1930. In basketball, Lacy twice earned all-Smoky Mountain Conference honors as a guard, in 1929 and 1930. He graduated from Milligan in 1931 with cum laude honors.

Lacy began his coaching and teaching career at Mary Hughes High School in Piney Flats, Tennessee, where he was athletic director, coach, teacher, and principal for two years. In 1933, he was hired as athletic director and head coach of football and baseball at his alma, mater, Milligan.

Lacy, known as "Mr. Democrat", was an influential member of the Tennessee Democratic Party, serving as an adviser to Al Gore, United States Senator and Vice President of the United States, Ned McWherter, Governor of Tennessee, and Jim Sasser, United States Senator. He died on February 3, 2000, at Johnson City Medical Center, in Johnson City, Tennessee.

Head coaching record

College football

References

1908 births
2000 deaths
Guards (basketball)
Milligan Buffaloes athletic directors
Milligan Buffaloes football coaches
Milligan Buffaloes football players
Milligan Buffaloes men's basketball players
High school football coaches in Tennessee
High school basketball coaches in Tennessee
Schoolteachers from Tennessee
Tennessee Democrats
People from Sullivan County, Tennessee
Coaches of American football from Tennessee
Players of American football from Tennessee
Baseball coaches from Tennessee
Basketball coaches from Tennessee
Basketball players from Tennessee